Juncus caespiticius, the grassy rush, is a species of flowering plant in the family Juncaceae, native to coastal areas of southern Australia and New Zealand. It usually grows in cool damp areas, preferring fresh or slightly brackish water.

References

caespiticius
Flora of Western Australia
Flora of South Australia
Flora of New South Wales
Flora of Victoria (Australia)
Flora of Tasmania
Flora of the North Island
Flora of the South Island
Plants described in 1846